Gilbert Renault (August 6, 1904 – July 29, 1984), known by the nom de guerre Colonel Rémy, was a notable French secret agent active in World War II, and was known under various pseudonyms such as Raymond, Jean-Luc, Morin, Watteau, Roulier, Beauce and Rémy.

Biography

Gilbert Renault was born in Vannes, France, the oldest child of a Catholic family of nine children. His father was a professor of Philosophy and English, and later the inspector general of an insurance company. He went to the Collège St-François-Xavier in Vannes, and after his studies he went to the Rennes faculty. His sisters were Maisie Renault and Madeleine Cestari.

A sympathizer of French Action in the Catholic and Nationalist line, he began his career at the Bank of France in 1924. In 1936, he began cinematic production and finances, and made J'accuse, a new version of the Abel Gance film. It was a resounding failure, but the many connections Renault made during this period were very useful during the resistance.

With armistice declared of June 18, 1940, he refused to accept Marshal Philippe Pétain and went to London with one of his brothers, on board a trawler which departed from Lorient. He was one of the first men to adhere to the calls of General Charles de Gaulle, and was entrusted by Colonel Passy, then captain and chief of the BCRA, to create an information network in France.

In August of that year he met with Louis de La Bardonnie, and together they created the Notre-Dame Brotherhood, which would become NDT-Castille in 1944. Initially centered on the Atlantic coast, it ended up covering much of occupied France and Belgium. This network was one of the most important in the occupied zone, and its information allowed many military successes, as the attack on Bruneval and on Saint-Nazaire.

Convinced that it was necessary to mobilize all forces against the occupation, he put the French Communist Party in touch with the exiled government of Free France in January 1943. Gilbert Renault later admitted it was Pierre Brossolette who got him in touch with political groups and trade unions.

Awarded the Ordre de la Libération on March 13, 1942, he became a member of the executive committee of the Rally of the French People (RPF) from its creation, in charge of trips and demonstrations. He appeared in Carrefour, April 11, 1950, in an article entitled 'La justice et l'opprobre' (Justice and the Opprobrium), in which he preached the rehabilitation of Marshal Pétain. A short time afterwards, he adhered to the Association of defense of the memory of Marshal Pétain (ADMP). Repudiated by de Gaulle, he resigned from the RPF.

He settled in Portugal in 1954 and returned to France in 1958 to be placed at de Gaulle's disposal, who refused. He was also very active from this time onwards in various associations, including ultra-conservative Catholic networks.

He died in Guingamp, France, in 1984.

Renault wrote many works on his activities in the Resistance. Under the name of Rémy (one of his pseudonyms in clandestinity), he published his Mémoires d'un agent secret de la France libre et La Ligne de démarcation (adapted for cinema by Claude Chabrol in 1966), which are regarded as important testimonies on the French Resistance.

He had the writer Jean Cayrol under his orders.

Decorations

 Commandeur de la Légion d'honneur
 Compagnon de la Libération - décret du 13 mars 1942
 Croix de Guerre 1939-1945
 Médaille de la Résistance avec rosette
 Distinguished Service Order (G.B.)
 Officer of the Order of the British Empire (G.B.)
 Officer of the Legion of Merit (U.S.)
 Officier de la Couronne de Belgique
 Croix de Guerre Belge
 Commandeur du Mérite (Luxembourg)

Homage
Around 1993, a street in Caen (France) was named after Colonel Rémy, in a district close to the Mémorial pour la Paix museum, where a majority of streets commemorate personalities linked with World War II, the Résistance, and the subsequent making of the European Community.

Portrayed in film and television 
 Le Grand Charles - French television - portrayed by French actor Sam Spiegel.

Bibliography 
 1946–1950: Mémoires d'un agent secret de la France libre, Raoul Solar
 Volume 1, Mémoires d'un agent secret de la France libre (juin 1940-juin 1942)
 Volume 2, Le livre du courage et de la peur T.1 (juin 1942-novembre 1943)
 Volume 3, Le livre du courage et de la peur T.2 (juin 1942-novembre 1943)
 Volume 4, Comment meut un réseau (novembre 1943-août 1944)
 Volume 5, Une affaire de trahison
 Volume 6, Les mains jointes (1944)
 Volume 7, …Mais le temple est bâti (1944-1945)
(Reorganized in the posterior editions):
 Volume 1, Le Refus
 Volume 2, Les Soldats du silence
 Volume 3, La Délivrance)
 1947: De Gaulle cet inconnu, Raoul Solar
 1948: La Nuit des oliviers, Raoul Solar
 1949: Le Monument, Fayard
 1949: Nous sommes ainsi faits, Chavane
 1950: La Justice et l'opprobre, suivi d'une note sur l'intolérance, Éditions du Rocher
 1951: On m'appelait Rémy, Plon
 1952: Réseaux d'ombre, Éditions France-Empire
 1952: Le Messie, Editions du Rocher
 1953: Profil d'un espion, Plon
 1953: Pourpre des martyrs, Fayard
 1953: Un architecte de Dieu, le père François Pallu, Fayard
 1953: Œuvres libres, Fayard
 1954: Leur calvaire, Fayard
 1954: Passeurs clandestins, Fayard
 1954: L'Opération "Jéricho", Éditions France-Empire
 1955: Goa, Rome de l'Orient, Éditions France-Empire
 1956: Les Caravelles du Christ, Plon
 1956: Les Mains revêtues de lumière, Plon
 1957: Fatima, espérance du Monde, Plon
 1957: Portugal, Hachette
 1959: Dix marches vers l'Espoir, Presses de la Cité
 1960: De sang et de chair, Le livre contemporain
 1960: Le monocle noir, Hachette
 1961: Le Joueur de flute, Presses de la Cité
 1961: Catéchisme de la patrie, Éditions France-Empire
 1961: J.A. épisodes de la vie d'un agent du S.R. et du contre-espionnage français, Galic (J.A. sont les initiales de Jacques Abtey)
 1962: Le Monocle passe et gagne, Hachette
 1962: Les Balcons de Tulle, Librairie académique Perrin
 1963: La grande prière de Chartres, Dimanche 29 Septembre 1963, Histoire du pèlerinage national pour la réconciliation dans la justice et la compréhension mutuelle, France-empire
 1963: La Dernière carte, Presses de la cité
 1963: Comment devenir agent secret, Albin Michel
 1964: Compagnons de l'Honneur, France-Empire, Paris
 1964 - 1976: La Ligne de démarcation, Librairie académique Perrin (21 volumes)
 1967: Réseau Comète, Librairie académique Perrin
 1968: Bruneval, Opération coup de croc, France-Empire
 1968: Le Déjeuner de la croix de Vernuche, Librairie académique Perrin
 1968: La Maison d'Alphonse, Perrin, 1968
 1969: Autour de la plage Bonaparte, suite de «la Maison d'Alphonse, Perrin
 1969: Le Pianiste,  Éditions France-Empire
 1969: Et l'Angleterre sera détruite,  Éditions France-Empire
 1971: Dans l'ombre du maréchal, Presses de la cité
 1971: Dix ans avec de Gaulle, 1940 - 1950,  Éditions France-Empire, Paris
 1972: Avec l'oflag VIII F, Presses de la Cité
 1973: Le Schloss ou l'évadé malgré lui,  Éditions France-Empire
 1974: Avec les Ch'timis : en souvenir du réseau Sylvestre Farmer,ex W.O., France-Empire
 1974: Mission Marathon, Librairie académique Perrin
 1974: Trente ans après - 6 Juin 1944 / 6 Juin 1974, Librairie Académique Perrin
 1974 - 1975: Les Français dans la Résistance, Famot (29 Volumes : En Lorraine, En Provence, En Bretagne, A Paris et dans la Région Parisienne, En Aquitaine, En Auvergne, Limousin, Berry, En Champagne Ardennes, En Languedoc Roussillon, En Alsace et Vosges, Dans le Nord, Dans le Lyonnais, En Normandie, En Dauphiné Savoie, En Corse, T. 2, En Anjou, Touraine, Orléanais, T. 1, En Bourgogne Franche-Comté, T. 1...)
 1975: Missions secrètes, Famot
 1975: Morhange. Les chasseurs de traites, Flammarion
 1976: Le 18e jour : la tragédie de Léopold III, Roi des Belges, France-Empire
 1976: Combats dans l'ombre, Idégraf
 1978: Rognes et grognes du Général - 1940-1944, Versoix
 1979: Histoire du débarquement, Vernoy
 1979: Secrets et réussites de l'espionnage français, Famot
 1979: Une épopée de la Résistance : en France, en Belgique et au Grand Duché du Luxembourg, Paris
 1979: La Résistance a commencé le 3 septembre 1939, Plon
 1979 - 1983: Chronique d'une guerre perdue, France-empire
 Volume 1, L'Entre-Deux-Guerre
 Volume 2, Le 10 Mai 1940
 Volume 3, Sedan
 Volume 4, De la Norvège aux Flandres
 Volume 5, La Bataille de France
 Volume 6, Fors l'Honneur
 1981: De sang et de chair, Édito-service
 1981: Combattre jusqu'au bout, Plon
 1981: La résistance en France 1940-1945, Collet
 1982: Mes grands hommes et quelques autres, Grasset
 1984: La Résistance à vingt ans, Ouest France
 1984: La Seconde guerre mondiale : la Résistance, Éd. Christophe Colomb
 1986: La Résistance, Hatier

Sources
(Mostly translated from the French article on Gilbert Renault)
 Grandmaison (Henri de), Le colonel Rémy, un héros de l'ombre, CMD, 2000.
 Perrier (Guy), Rémy - L'agent secret n° 1 de la France libre, Perrin, 2001.

References

External links
 Ordre de la libération - Fiche de Gilbert Renault

1904 births
1984 deaths
French Resistance members
Officers of the Legion of Merit
Recipients of the Resistance Medal
Officers of the Order of Merit of the Grand Duchy of Luxembourg
University of Rennes alumni